Antonio de Jesús Díaz Athié (born 14 January 1958) is a Mexican politician affiliated with the PRI. He currently serves as Deputy of the LXII Legislature of the Mexican Congress representing Chiapas. He also served as Deputy during the LX Legislature.

References

1958 births
Living people
Institutional Revolutionary Party politicians
21st-century Mexican politicians
Deputies of the LXII Legislature of Mexico
Members of the Chamber of Deputies (Mexico) for Chiapas